Hrvoje Filipan (born 22 August 1972) is a Croatian judoka.

Achievements

References

1972 births
Living people
Croatian male judoka
Mediterranean Games bronze medalists for Croatia
Mediterranean Games medalists in judo
Competitors at the 1993 Mediterranean Games
20th-century Croatian people